Micropolix is a privately held Spanish family entertainment center company currently operating in San Sebastian de los Reyes, Madrid, allowing children to work in adult jobs and earn currency. Micropolix has received more than 2.5 million guests since its opening, making it the most well known  edutainment brand in Spain.

Overview
Every Micropolix is themed as a child-sized replica of a real city, including buildings, shops and theaters, as well as vehicles and pedestrians moving along its streets. In this city, children aged 4 through 16, work in branded activities from retail El Corte Ingles, investigating in a I+D*i food lab Pascual or even learning how to be a responsible driver at Renault circuit. More than 40 different activities counting on one hundred roles. The children earn Eurix (Micropolix’s currency) while performing the tasks, and the money is kept in the Micropolix bank for children to spend on the activities.

Four years after its opening more than 2.5 million visitors had visited the site. Along these years Micropolix has been featured in many print and TV media, spotlighting its blending of creativity, entrepreneurship and education.

History 
Micropolix was created and developed by Spanish entrepreneur Javier Carballo, starting operations in December 2008 after several years of ardouos preparation. He was its CEO until he divested from the company to start news projects in 2010.

Awards and recognition 
Micropolix has been awarded from various organizations that -aware of their uniqueness- have highlighting its educational values:  "Childhood 2009 Award"; "Protagonist of Education 2012 Award".

References

External links 
 

Tourist attractions in Madrid
Entertainment in Spain